Achille Peretti (13 June 1911 – 14 April 1983), was a French politician.

Peretti was born in Ajaccio. A lawyer by profession, he was a member of the French resistance, and was in charge of security of Charles de Gaulle's government in Algiers.

After the war, Peretti pursued a business career. A member of the French parliament from 1958 to 1977, he became chairman of the National Assembly in 1969 when Jacques Chaban-Delmas was nominated as prime minister. After the right-wing coalition's narrow victory in the 1973 elections, he had to step down and was replaced by Edgar Faure.

Peretti was the mayor of Neuilly-sur-Seine from 1947 until his death. He was succeeded by Nicolas Sarkozy who had become his political protégé.

References

External links 
 Peretti's page on the Assemblée Nationale's database 

1911 births
1983 deaths
Politicians from Ajaccio
Union for the New Republic politicians
Union of Democrats for the Republic politicians
Rally for the Republic politicians
Presidents of the National Assembly (France)
Deputies of the 1st National Assembly of the French Fifth Republic
Deputies of the 2nd National Assembly of the French Fifth Republic
Deputies of the 3rd National Assembly of the French Fifth Republic
Deputies of the 4th National Assembly of the French Fifth Republic
Deputies of the 5th National Assembly of the French Fifth Republic
20th-century French businesspeople
French Resistance members
Companions of the Liberation